Sadok Sassi, nicknamed "Attouga" (born 15 November 1945 in Tunis) is a Tunisian former footballer who played as a goalkeeper for Club Africain and the Tunisia national team.

He played both matches for the Tunisia national team at the 1963 African Cup of Nations.

In a sixteen-years career, Sassi earned an impressive five league titles, eight cups, including three for Tunisia and the Maghreb. In 1972, he was goalkeeper for the African team at the mini-World Cup, hosted by Brazil.

The national team's undisputed first-choice goalkeeper for many years, he missed Tunisia's first World Cup appearance in 1978 through injury, and was replaced by Mokhtar Naili. Sassi earned a total of 116 international caps; however, only 87 matches were considered as A-international by FIFA. He was awarded the African Football's Silver Order of Merit by CAF.

After retiring he has worked as a General Manager for Club Africain.

References

External links
 

1945 births
Living people
Tunisian footballers
Association football goalkeepers
Tunisia international footballers
1978 FIFA World Cup players
1963 African Cup of Nations players
1965 African Cup of Nations players
1978 African Cup of Nations players
Competitors at the 1975 Mediterranean Games
Mediterranean Games bronze medalists for Tunisia
Mediterranean Games medalists in football